Yellowstone is an American neo-Western drama television series created by Taylor Sheridan and John Linson that premiered on June 20, 2018, on Paramount Network.

 The series was renewed for a fifth season that was originally to be split into two installments of seven episodes each; the first part of the fifth season aired as 8 episodes, to be followed with the second half of the fifth season expected in mid-2023. The fifth season premiered on November 13, 2022, with two episodes, and the first part installment ended on January 1, 2023.

Series overview

Episodes

Season 1 (2018)

Season 2 (2019)

Season 3 (2020)

Season 4 (2021–22)

Season 5 (2022–23)

Ratings
The two-hour series premiere of Yellowstone averaged 2.8 million viewers in live + same day and became the most-watched original scripted series telecast ever on Paramount Network (or its predecessor Spike). The premiere audience grows to nearly 4 million when the two encore airings of the premiere are factored in. The premiere audience more than doubled that of Paramount Network's first scripted drama series, Waco and more than tripled the debut viewership of Paramount Network's new comedy series, American Woman. It was later reported that the premiere's Live+3 Nielsen ratings revealed that 4.8 million viewers ultimately watched the premiere after delayed viewing was factored in. By the series' third episode, it was reported that the show had become the second-most-watched television series on ad-supported cable to air in 2018, only behind AMC's The Walking Dead.

Yellowstones fourth season premiere broke records. The two-hour premiere was watched by 8.38 million viewers in live + same day, which made it cable's most watched episode since 2018. The premiere also hit a new series high in the key adults 18-49 demo, drawing a 3.26 rating in adults 18-49 (L+SD), which was up 82% from the Season 3 premiere. Chris McCarthy, president and CEO of MTV Entertainment Studios, commented "Taylor has created a riveting world that our remarkable cast led by Kevin Costner brings to life in a way audiences can't get enough of. The Yellowstone season four premiere numbers are just another reason why we are thrilled to deepen our relationship with Taylor and capitalize on this tremendous momentum by building out the Yellowstone franchise together."

Season 1

Season 2

Season 3

Season 4

Season 5

Notes

References 

Yellowstone
Yellowstone